HMS Hart was one of three s built for the Royal Navy in the 1890s.  Completed in 1895 she spent most of her career on the China Station and was sold in 1912.

Description
Ordered as part of the 1893–1894 Naval Programme, the Hardy-class torpedo boat destroyers were Fairfield Shipbuilding and Engineering Company's first such ships. They were powered by a pair of triple-expansion steam engines, each driving a single propeller shaft using steam provided by four Thornycroft water-tube boilers.

The ships were armed with a single quick-firing (QF) 12-pounder (3 in (76 mm) Mk I gun and five QF 6-pounder Mk I Hotchkiss guns in single mounts. Their torpedo armament consisted of two rotating torpedo tubes for 18-inch (450 mm) torpedoes, one mount amidships and the other on the stern.

Construction and career
Hart was laid down by Fairfield at its Govan shipyard on 7 June 1894, launched on 27 March 1895 and completed in January 1896.

Lieutenant George Cecil Hardy was appointed in command on 15 January 1901, leaving her for the HMS Handy three months later in April 1901. Both ships served on the China Station. Hardy was back in command in late 1902 (notified in July). The ship was sold for scrap in 1912.

Notes

Bibliography

Handy-class destroyers
1895 ships
Ships built in Govan